The Poland national under-18 football team represents Poland in international football at this age level and is controlled by Polish Football Association.

This team is for Polish players aged 18 or under at the start of a two-year European Under-18 Football Championship campaign.

Competitive record
*Denotes draws include knockout matches decided on penalty kicks.
Gold background colour indicates that the tournament was won.
Silver background colour indicates second place finish.
Bronze background colour indicates third place finish.
Red border color indicates tournament was held on home soil.

FIFA Youth Tournament Under-18

UEFA Youth Tournament Under-18

UEFA European U-18 Championship

Recent results

Current squad
The following players were called up for the friendly games against Bulgaria on 24 and 27 March 2023.

Caps and goals updated as of 25 September 2022 after the match against .

Recent call-ups
The following players (born in 2005 or later) have previously been called up to the Poland under-17 squad in the last 12 months and are still eligible to represent:

 INJ

INJ Withdrew from the squad due to an injury.

See also
 Poland national football team
 Poland Olympic football team
 Poland national under-21 football team
 Poland national under-20 football team
 Poland national under-19 football team
 Poland national under-17 football team
 Poland national under-16 football team

References

External links
 PZPN Under-18 website

U
European national under-18 association football teams